This is a list of the national coats of arms of South American countries.

Sovereign states

Dependencies and other territories

See also

 Flags of South America
 Armorial of sovereign states
 Armorial of Africa
 Armorial of North America
 Armorial of Asia
 Armorial of Europe
 Armorial of Oceania

External links

South America
South America-related lists
 
South America